Bak Tae-ho (born May 19, 1947) is a South Korean voice actor.

He joined the Munhwa Broadcasting Corporation's voice acting division in 1972.

Roles

Broadcast television
 E-Mark (narration, MBC) 
 Miracle Girls (Korea TV Edition, MBC)
 Dok Go Tak (MBC)
 Sapire Prince (MBC)
 Space Sheriff Jango (MBC)
 Tom Soyer's Adventure (MBC)
 Gerrison Trooper (Korea TV Edition in 1971, MBC)

Broadcast Radio
 History 50 (MBC)

See also
 Munhwa Broadcasting Corporation
 MBC Voice Acting Division

Homepage
 MBC Voice Acting Division Bak Tae Ho Blog(in Korean)

Living people
South Korean male voice actors
1947 births